Makowiska  is a village in the administrative district of Gmina Solec Kujawski, within Bydgoszcz County, Kuyavian-Pomeranian Voivodeship, in north-central Poland.

During the German occupation of Poland (World War II), the Germans established and operated a forced labour subcamp of the German military prison in Grudziądz.

References

Makowiska